Swaffham Prior is a small village in East Cambridgeshire, England.

Lying 5 miles west of Newmarket, and two miles south west of Burwell, the village is often paired with its neighbour Swaffham Bulbeck, and are collectively referred to as 'The Swaffhams'. Swaffham Prior was often known as Great Swaffham in past centuries. It should not be confused with the town of Swaffham in Norfolk.

Churches 

The village is dominated by its twin churches that have served the parish since at least the 12th century – the Church of St Mary, and the Church of St Cyriac and St Julitta (dedicated to Saint Quiricus and Saint Julietta). In 1667 an act of parliament combined the churches under a single parish.

The church of St Mary was first built in Norman times, and over its history has at times been allowed to fall into ruin, only being fully restored at the start of the 20th century and serving as the sole parish church since 1903. It contains a rood screen, and has a series of stained glass windows showing scenes from World War I. 

The original church of St Cyriac and St Julitta (Cyriac's mother) was built prior to 1200, and may possibly have existed before 1066. The present chapel is a plain Gothic-style church, consisting of a small chancel and nave with three small transeptal chapels. The tower was built in the 15th century and contains 6 bells. Having fallen into disuse, in 1878 an order was received that the church be demolished, but the order was never carried out. It now serves as a hall for exhibitions and other functions. Scottish poet Edwin Muir (1887–1959) is buried here.

John George Witt, the barrister and Q.C./K.C., was born in 1836 at Denny Abbey, Waterbeach, Cambridgeshire, and was a son of James Maling Witt (1799–1870), a prosperous farmer at Waterbeach and at Queens' College Farm, Swaffham Prior. J.G. Witt lived at Swaffham Prior during much of his youth and early manhood. He died in London in 1906. J.G. Witt's uncle, Dr. George Witt (1804 - 1869), was born at Swaffham Prior and died at 22 Princes' Terrace, Hyde Park, London. He was buried at Swaffham Prior.

History and background

Just a mile or so north of Swaffham Prior is the Anglo-Saxon defensive earthwork known as the Devil's Dyke, blocking a land route through the fens.

Swaffham Prior is an old village, and is mentioned in the Domesday Book of 1086 as possibly 'Great Swaffham', with Swaffham Bulbeck being 'Little Swaffham'. There are houses in the village dating back several centuries, with the 17th century being most prominent. Though previously a trading village, today it could be described as a 'dormitory' village especially looking back on its busier past. Local facilities include a local primary school and The Red Lion pub. There's also a village hall, hosting village feasts, village fêtes, etc.

Swaffham Prior is also known for its two windmills (one still operating as a mill) which are symbols of the village, seen on the village sign on Cage Hill.

Geography 
Swaffham Prior chalk escarpment, observable only in a few places within the village is largely physically hidden from view. This local geological feature of the landscape is the chalk (local term clunch) escarpment of Swaffham Prior and it runs the full length of this East Cambridgeshire village dating back to Anglo-saxon times. The more modern sections of the village are built along the top of the escarpment with the older houses nestling below the cliff face backing on to the high street.

The chalk escarpment straddles two very different local eco-systems- the Cambridgeshire Fens to the west, where the land slopes down and the chalk heathland to the east, known locally as Swaffham Prior heath, part of the Greater Newmarket chalk heath, where the land height increases and plateaus into a larger area towards the east.

In a few places, the ridge of the escarpment is exposed, although usually within private property. A fraction of it can be seen from the high street, opposite the parish play area.

Demography 
Census counts for the village have been paired with Burwell and Reach at various times. These pairings due to boundary changes have been excluded from the table below.

Notes and references

External links

Swaffham Prior – 2001 Census
World War I commemorative stained glass
A history of Swaffham Prior's churches
The Swaffham Crier – Swaffham Prior's Village Magazine
Swaffham Prior in A Vision of Britain

Villages in Cambridgeshire
Civil parishes in Cambridgeshire
Escarpments of England
Landforms of Cambridgeshire
East Cambridgeshire District